During the 2001–02 English football season, Stockport County competed in the Football League First Division.

Season summary
The 2001–02 season turned out to be the Stockport's worst ever season at the time. With Stockport already bottom of the league, a 4–0 home defeat to Millwall saw manager Kilner sacked. Shortly after he was replaced with former England international Carlton Palmer. A 2–1 win over Norwich gave them some hope, but Stockport then went on to lose 11 matches in a row, another unwanted club record. The Hatters picked up just 3 more wins during the rest of the season (one of these being another unforgettable 2–1 victory over Manchester City, having been 1–0 down with just 5 minutes left) finishing the season with just 26 points, going down on 16 March, the quickest post-war relegation.

Final league table

Results
Stockport County's score comes first

Legend

Football League First Division

FA Cup

League Cup

Squad

Left club during season

References

Stockport County
Stockport County F.C. seasons